This following people are natives of or lived in Kent, Ohio, but not exclusively as students at Kent State University.

References

Kent
Kent, Ohio